Saint-Pal-de-Mons is a commune in the Haute-Loire department in south-central France.

Population

Personalities
Paul Durieu (1830–1899), first Bishop of New Westminster in British Columbia, Canada

See also
Communes of the Haute-Loire department

References

Communes of Haute-Loire